William Carnsew (by 1497 – 1570), of Bokelly in St. Kew, Cornwall, was an English politician.

He was a Member of Parliament (MP) for Bossiney in 1547. Carnsew wrote about his visits to other important houses in Cornwall.

References

15th-century births
1570 deaths
English MPs 1547–1552
Politicians from Cornwall
Members of the pre-1707 English Parliament for constituencies in Cornwall